Orient Electric Limited is an Indian multinational electrical equipment manufacturer, based in New Delhi and part of CK Birla Group. It makes fans, lighting, home appliances and switchgears. Orient Electric has manufacturing facilities in Kolkata, Faridabad and Noida. It exports fans from India to over 35 international markets.

Orient Electric was a division of Orient Paper & Industries, until its demerger in 2018.

References

External links
 How Orient Electric is reinventing itself
 Scheme of arrangement
 Orient Electric enters Health Applainces space, launches UV Sanitech, a UVC light based sanitisation chamber

Electronics companies of India
Home appliance manufacturers of India
Manufacturing companies based in Delhi
Companies based in New Delhi
Electronics companies established in 1954
Manufacturing companies established in 1954
Indian companies established in 1954
CK Birla Group
Indian brands
Companies listed on the National Stock Exchange of India
Companies listed on the Bombay Stock Exchange